The 2008 CECAFA Cup was the 32nd edition of the football tournament that involves teams from East and Central Africa.

All matches were played from 31 December 2008 to 13 January 2009 at the National Stadium, Kampala, Uganda.

Information
 originally scheduled for 8 November till 22 November in Kampala; postponed to January 2009 because some of the competing countries were yet to meet conditions set by GTV, the main sponsors.
 The winner of this year's competition will receive $30,000, the second-placed team will be given $20,000, with $10,000 going to the side that comes third.
  left out due to FIFA suspension
   pulled out due to administrative wrangles in the home federation.

Group A

Group B

Semi finals

Third place play-off

Final

Top goalscorers

References

External links
Goal updates
BBC's African Football Site, includes reports from the tournament.

CECAFA Cup
CECAFA Cup
CECAFA Cup
CECAFA Cup
International association football competitions hosted by Uganda